Jalal is a village located in the Bathinda district of Punjab, India. Baba Jalal found this area and named it as village Jalal. It was also known as ਅੱਠ ਜਲਾਲਾ ਵਾਲਾ (Aṭha jalālā vālā) because the relatives of Baba Jalal lived in nearby 8 villages.  

The population of the village was reported as 6,500 in 2011. The village has around 400 Muslims. Punjabi singer, Kuldeep Manak, hailed from and is buried here.

Avatr singh Numberdar /jaldar gurcharn singh Numberdar

References 

Villages in Bathinda district